Embryo rescue is one of the earliest and successful forms of in-vitro culture techniques that is used to assist in the development of plant embryos that might not survive to become viable plants.  Embryo rescue plays an important role in modern plant breeding, allowing the development of many interspecific and intergeneric food and ornamental plant crop hybrids. This technique nurtures the immature or weak embryo, thus allowing it the chance to survive. Plant embryos are multicellular structures that have the potential to develop into a new plant. The most widely used embryo rescue procedure is referred to as embryo culture, and involves excising plant embryos and placing them onto media culture. Embryo rescue is most often used to create interspecific and intergeneric crosses that would normally produce seeds which are aborted. Interspecific incompatibility in plants can occur for many reasons, but most often embryo abortion occurs   In plant breeding, wide hybridization crosses can result in small shrunken seeds which indicate that fertilization has occurred, however the seed fails to develop. Many times, remote hybridizations will fail to undergo normal sexual reproduction, thus embryo rescue can assist in circumventing this problem.

History
Embryo rescue was first documented in the 18th century when Charles Bonnet excised Phaseolus and Fagopyrum embryos and was successful in it , planted them in soil and the cross resulted in dwarf plants. Soon after this, scientists began placing the embryos in various nutrient media.  During the period of 1890 to 1904, systems for embryo rescue became systematic by applying nutrient solutions that contained salts and sugars and applying aseptic technique. The first successful in vitro embryo culture was performed by Hanning in 1904, he however described problems with precocious embryos that resulted in small, weak, and often inviable plantlets.

Applications

 Breeding of incompatible interspecific and intergeneric species
 Overcoming seed dormancy
 Determination of seed viability
 Recovery of maternal haploids that develop as a result of chromosome elimination following interspecific hybridization
 Used in studies on the physiology of seed germination and development

Techniques

Depending on the organ cultured, it may be referred to as either embryo, ovule, or ovary culture. Ovule culture or in vitro embryo culture is a modified technique of embryo rescue whereby embryos are cultured while still inside their ovules to prevent damaging them during the excision process. Ovary or pod culture, on the other hand employs the use of an entire ovary into culture. It becomes necessary to excise the entire small embryo to prevent early embryo abortion. However, it is technically difficult to isolate the tiny intact embryos, so often ovaries with young embryos, or entire fertilized ovules will be used.

Factors to consider

Embryos are manually excised and placed immediately onto a culture medium that provides the proper nutrients to support survival and growth (Miyajima 2006). While the disinfestation and explant excision processes differ for these three techniques, many of the factors that contribute to the successful recovery of viable plants are similar. The main factors that influence success are; the time of culture, the composition of the medium, and temperature and light. Timing mainly refers to the maturation stage of the embryo before excision. The optimal time especially for the rescue of embryos involving incompatible crosses would be just prior to embryo abortion. Nevertheless, due to difficulties involved with the rearing of young embryos compared to those that have reached the autotrophic phase of development, embryos are normally allowed to develop in vivo as long as possible. While in general, two main types of basal media are the most commonly used for embryo rescue studies, i.e. Murashige and Skoog medium (MS)  and Gamborg’s B-5 media  (Bridgen, 1994), the composition of the medium will vary in terms of the concentrations of media supplements required. This will generally depend on the stage of development of the embryo. For instance, young embryos would require a complex medium with high sucrose concentrations, while more mature embryos can usually develop on a simple medium with low levels of sucrose. The temperature and light requirement is generally species specific and thus its usually regulated to be the within the same temperature requirement as that of its parent with embryos of cool-season crops requiring lower temperatures than those of warm-season crops.

Both plant and animal cells, tissues and organ culture is possible in artificial nutrient medium in controlled laboratory conditions. Many desired products can be obtained through tissue culture like pharmaceutical drugs, vaccines, and monoclonal antibodies.

See also
Plant embryogenesis
Callus (cell biology)
Plant tissue culture
Plant hormone
Hyperhydricity
Somatic embryogenesis

References

External links
 http://www.stbw.nl/Embryo-Rescue%20Techniques.pdf

Agronomy